Aren Nielsen (born July 5, 1968) is an American former competitive figure skater. He is the 1988 Nebelhorn Trophy champion, the 1990 Golden Spin of Zagreb champion, and a two-time U.S. national bronze medalist. He placed 13th at the 1994 World Championships in Chiba, Japan. He is currently the skating director at the Atlanta IceForum in Duluth, Georgia.

Competitive highlights
GP: Champions Series (Grand Prix)

Other competitive highlights

External links

American male single skaters
1968 births
Living people
Competitors at the 1994 Goodwill Games